Anthidium latum is a species of bee in the family Megachilidae, the leaf-cutter, carder, or mason bees.

Distribution
Argentina
Brazil
Paraguay

Synonyms
Synonyms for this species include:
Anthidium codoense Ducke, 1907
Anthidium cingulatum Friese, 1909
Anthidium insignissimum Strand, 1910
Anthidium latum var asuncionanum Strand, 1910
Anthidium variegatipes Cockerell, 1927
Tetranthidium latum (Schrottky, 1902)

References

latum
Insects described in 1902